Henri Bourassa (1868–1952) was a French Canadian political leader and publisher.

Henri Bourassa may also refer to:
Boulevard Henri-Bourassa, a street in Montreal, Canada named for the above
Terminus Henri-Bourassa
Henri-Bourassa (Montreal Metro)
171 Henri-Bourassa, bus route
École Secondaire Henri-Bourassa